The 1937 Chicago Bears season was their 18th regular season completed in the National Football League. The Bears started the season fast, winning their first five games, three of them on the road. After a tie to the Giants and a loss to the Packers, the Bears finished the season strong, winning their last four games. The team was second in scoring offense, behind Green Bay, and led the league in scoring defense.

1937 NFL Draft

Season highlights
The Bear offense relied on a rugged rushing attack and a quick-strike passing game. Sixteen of their 21 offensive touchdowns were through the air and the team averaged a league-leading 18.3 yards per completion. Future hall of fame end Bill Hewitt was gone to Philadelphia and Luke Johnsos did not play so coach Halas relied on young Les McDonald and "Eggs" Manske, along with veteran Bill Karr to catch the long ball. Bernie Masterson was still the primary quarterback but rookie Ray Buivid played regularly and showed promise, particularly in the season finale win over the Chicago Cardinals where he became the first player to pass for five touchdowns, and the only rookie to do so until 2015. Ray Nolting led the team in rushing, with Bronko Nagurski and Jack Manders contributing as well. Manders led the league in scoring with 8 field goals and 15 of 20 PATs, finishing with 69 points. The Bears' interior line was their real strong suit, however, with Musso, Stydahar, and Fortmann anchoring the best line in the NFL. Frank Bausch emerged as a top flight center as well. With a consistent offense and a solid defense, the Bears were the class of the West, finishing 2½ games ahead of the Packers and Lions and winning 3 of 4 games against those two teams.

On October 6, 1937, the team scheduled a charity exhibition game against the Warren Redjackets. Because Warren, Pennsylvania was too small of a city to support such a game, the game was held in Erie, Pennsylvania and Warren's fans were transported to Erie by rail. Chicago won the game 49–7.

Future Hall of Fame players
Dan Fortmann, guard
George Musso, tackle
Bronko Nagurski, fullback
Joe Stydahar, tackle (rookie from West Virginia University)

Other leading players
Frank Bausch, center (acquired from Boston Redskins)
Ray Buivid, back (rookie from Marquette)
Bill Karr, end
Jack Manders, fullback/kicker
Edgar Manske, end (acquired from Philadelphia Eagles)
Bernie Masterson, quarterback
Les McDonald, end (rookie from University of Nebraska)
Keith Molesworth, halfback
Ray Nolting, halfback (rookie from University of Cincinnati)
Gene Ronzani, back

Players departed from 1936
Bill Hewitt, End (went to Philadelphia)
Luke Johnsos, End (did not play for unknown reasons)

Schedule

Note: Intra-division opponents are in bold text.

Standings

Championship Game
The Bears lost to the Washington Redskins at Wrigley Field 28–21. Rookie Sammy Baugh threw two fourth-quarter touchdown passes to upset the Bears. The Bears quarterbacks were ineffective, completing only 8 of 30 passes for 207 yards. Baugh set several NFL championship game records while completing 17 of 34 passes for 358 yards, three touchdowns and one interception.

References

Chicago Bears
Chicago Bears seasons
Chicago Bears